Mallampet is a village in Adilabad district of the Indian state of Telangana. It is located in Kotapalle mandal of the district.

References

Villages in Adilabad district